Erik Hollingsworth (born 23 August 1978 in United States) is an American former rugby league footballer, who played for the Glen Mills Bulls and the Connecticut Wildcats.

Playing career
Hollingsworth started his career at the Glen Mills Bulls in the 1990s. He earned the MVP award in the AMNRL in 2005, tied with Andrew Webster. He then went to Connecticut and retired a few years later.

References

1978 births
Living people
American rugby league players
Rugby league fullbacks
United States national rugby league team players